Youssef Wasef Mohamad (born 1 July 1980), also known as Dodo, is a Lebanese former professional footballer who is the technical advisor of the Lebanon national team.

Mohamad is one of the most successful players in the history of Lebanese football, captaining 1. FC Köln during his spell with the club in the Bundesliga, as well as the Lebanon national team.

Club career

Safa
Mohamad began his career at Lebanese Premier League side Safa, signing to the first-team from the youth team. He got promoted to the first team in 1999 and played for three years, making 25 league appearances and scoring 3 times.

Olympic Beirut
In summer 2002, he transferred to Olympic Beirut. Mohamad went on to win the domestic double (Lebanese Premier League and Lebanese FA Cup) in the 2002–03 season.

Freiburg
Mohamad joined Bundesliga side SC Freiburg in 2004, at the recommendation of his international teammate, Roda Antar. He scored his first goals, a brace, in a 3–3 draw against Greuther Fürth on 22 September 2006. Although Freiburg were relegated to the 2. Bundesliga, Mohamad remained there until his transfer to 1. FC Köln in 2007 along with Roda Antar.

1. FC Köln

Mohamad signed for Köln on 17 July 2007. He helped them gain promotion to the Bundesliga for the 2008–09 season.

In the 2009–10 season, he scored against Borussia Dortmund in a last-minute 3–2 defeat; Mohamad equalized the score in the 88th minute with a right footed goal. Mohamad received three yellow cards throughout the season.

In January 2010, Köln coach Zvonimir Soldo announced that Mohamad would be the captain of the club. He became the third Arab player to captain a Bundesliga club, after Egyptian player Hany Ramzy and Tunisian player Zoubeir Baya.

It took him 92 seconds to receive a red card on the opening day of the 2010–11 season on 21 August 2010, a 3–1 defeat to 1. FC Kaiserslautern; it was the fastest red card in Bundesliga history.

Al-Ahli
In August 2011, UAE Pro League side Al-Ahli announced the signing of Mohamad on a two-year deal.

Nejmeh
In September 2016, Mohamad returned to Lebanon, signing with Nejmeh. However he did not manage a single appearance as he was ruled out for injury; he subsequently retired from football in September of the same year.

International career
On 16 August 1999, Mohamad debuted for Lebanon in the 1999 Pan Arab Games. On 25 June 2000, Mohamad scored a free kick, his first international goal, in a 3–1 home victory against Kuwait.

In 2000, aged 20, Mohamad was selected to represent Lebanon at the 2000 AFC Asian Cup. On 12 October, he played the full 90 minutes in Lebanon's opening 4–0 loss against Iran. On 15 October, he was substituted onto the field in the 89th minute for Abbas Chahrour in a 2–2 draw against Iraq. However, he didn't take part in Lebanon's 1–1 draw with Thailand on 18 October.

In 2007, Mohamad reportedly had a disagreement with Lebanon's assistant coach Adnan Al Sharqi, where he had intensely criticized the Lebanese Football Association (LFA) and the national team coach. He was suspended by the LFA and would be allowed to return on the condition that he would apologize to the LFA and its national team coach.

Prior to the start of the third round of qualification for the 2014 FIFA World Cup game against South Korea and the United Arab Emirates in September 2011, it was reported that Mohamad had traveled to Goyang, South Korea to join the squad for the match.

Mohamad announced his retirement from international football in April 2016.

Managerial career
After retiring from football, in December 2016 Mohamad took the role of technical advisor of the Lebanon national team.

Career statistics

Club

International
Scores and results list Lebanon's goal tally first, score column indicates score after each Mohamad goal.

Honours
Olympic Beirut
 Lebanese Premier League: 2002–03
 Lebanese FA Cup: 2002–03

Al-Ahli
 UAE League Cup: 2011–12
 UAE President's Cup: 2012–13

Individual
 IFFHS All-time Lebanon Men's Dream Team
 Lebanese Premier League Team of the Season: 2002–03, 2003–04

See also
 List of Lebanon international footballers

References

External links

 
 Youssef Mohamad at RSSSF
 
 
 
 

Living people
1980 births
Lebanese footballers
People from Bint Jbeil District
Lebanese Muslims
Association football defenders
Safa SC players
Olympic Beirut players
SC Freiburg players
1. FC Köln players
Al Ahli Club (Dubai) players
Nejmeh SC players
Lebanese Premier League players
Bundesliga players
2. Bundesliga players
UAE Pro League players
Lebanon youth international footballers
Lebanon international footballers
2000 AFC Asian Cup players
Asian Games competitors for Lebanon
Footballers at the 2002 Asian Games
Lebanese expatriate footballers
Lebanese expatriate sportspeople in Germany
Lebanese expatriate sportspeople in the United Arab Emirates
Expatriate footballers in Germany
Expatriate footballers in the United Arab Emirates
Association football agents
Association football coaches